Belt wrestling was only contested at the 2013 Summer Universiade in Kazan, Russia.

Events

Medal table

References

Sports at the Summer Universiade
Universiade